Corea may refer to:
Korea, the term for the peninsula and its culture composed currently of two sovereign states, for which Corea is a spelling in many languages, especially Romance languages, and a former spelling in English
Korean Peninsula, the land area which Korea occupies
North Korea, one of the two sovereign states occupying the Korean peninsula
South Korea, one of the two sovereign states occupying the Korean peninsula
 Coreae, a place near Wadi al-Far'a (river)

Other places
A village in the town of Gouldsboro, Maine

People with the surname Corea
 Corea or Cooray, one of surname in Sri Lanka
Charles Alfred Ernest Corea, Sri Lankan lawyer
Charles Edgar Corea, Sri Lankan politician, President of the Ceylon National Congress (1924)
Claude Corea, Sri Lankan politician/diplomat, High Commissioner to the UK and Ambassador to the United States
Dominicus Corea, (Sinhalese name Edirille Rala), 16th Century ruler
Ernest Corea, Sri Lankan journalist and Ambassador to the United States
Gamani Corea, Sri Lankan economist, Secretary-General of UNCTAD
Gate Mudaliyar James Edward Corea, Sri Lankan public official in Colonial Ceylon
Harindra Corea, Sri Lankan politician, Deputy Foreign Minister
Ishvari Corea (1925 - 2019), Sri Lankan librarian
Ivan Corea, Sri Lankan clergyman of the Church of Ceylon
J.C.A. Corea, first Sri Lankan principal of Royal College Colombo
James Alfred Ernest Corea, Sri Lankan physician
Srikuradas Charles Shirley Corea, Sri Lankan politician, Speaker of the Parliament of Ceylon
Vernon Corea Sri Lankan/British radio broadcaster
Victor Corea, Sri Lankan politician and freedom fighter
Vijaya Corea, Sri Lankan radio and TV broadcaster
Chick Corea, jazz pianist
Nicholas J. Corea, American author

See also
Korea (disambiguation)
Names of Korea, the article on the various names for the nation/culture
Correa (disambiguation) (Spanish word and surname)
Correia (Portuguese and Galician word and surname)
Chorea (disambiguation) (A medical term for an involuntary movement disorder)
Corea (HBC vessel), see Hudson's Bay Company vessels

Sinhalese surnames